The 2012 Grand Prix de Denain was the 54th edition of the Grand Prix de Denain cycle race and was held on 12 April 2012. The race started and finished in Denain. The race was won by Juan José Haedo.

General classification

References

2012
2012 in road cycling
2012 in French sport